The 2016 Women's World Open Squash Championship is the women's edition of the 2016 World Championships, which serves as the individual world championship for squash players.

It was originally scheduled to take place in Malaysia. In January 2017, El Gouna was selected as the championships' replacement host, with the tournament scheduled to take place alongside the men's annual El Gouna Squash Open between 7 and 14 April 2017 inclusive. It is the third time in four editions the tournament has been held after its designated year.

Prize money and ranking points
For 2016, the prize purse was $165,000. The prize money and points breakdown is as follows:

Seeds

Draw and results

See also
World Championship
2016 Men's World Open Squash Championship

References

External links
cWorld Championship 2016 website

World Squash Championships
Women's World Open Squash Championship
Squash tournaments in Egypt
International sports competitions hosted by Egypt
2016 in Egyptian sport
2016 in women's squash